Pambos Christodoulou (born 17 October 1967, Galata) is a Cypriot football manager and former player, who is the current manager of Ethnikos Achna.

Playing career
Christodoulou played as a midfielder for Olympiakos Nicosia in the Cyprus First Division, between 1990–1995, having moved from Doxa Katokopias, which then played in the second division of Cyprus. He subsequently went to AEK Larnaca in the first division, before deciding to become a manager at the age of 39 in the 2006 season for Doxa Katokopias.

Managerial career

Doxa Katokopias 
In 2006, he took on his first managerial appointment with Doxa Katokopia FC then in the Cyprus Second Division. Doxa got promoted finishing 3rd in the last day of the season. In the next season, newly promoted Doxa would be favourite for relegation, however Pambos showed his cunning team building skills. He spent a lot of time in Portugal hunting for players with good technical skills, a good team spirit, with speed and on a low budget. He managed to find such players in the 2nd and 3rd levels in Portugal on a budget that Doxa could afford. The first player he signed was Angolan born Portuguese left back Rui Paulo Silva Júnior, who subsequently became a good friend and after retiring as a footballer would join him as Director of football at AEL Limassol. He used the player agent Costas Christodoulou (Karavidas) to help him bring the players to Cyprus and subsequently learned the tricks of the trade himself, in 2011 the Olympiakos Nicosia supporters club cast doubt on Christodoulou's scouting prowess by claiming that player agent Karavidas in fact finds and signs the players. Chrisodoulou vehemently denies this and is moving legally against the Olympiakos supporters for libel as he claims that Rui Junior and himself scout and find the players.  By overhauling Doxa's squad every season and building it nearly from scratch, some have argued this was done to gain more commission for everyone involved from bringing new players every year, but this is disputed as with this strategy he saved minnows Doxa from relegation for three consecutive years. These players mainly hailed from Portugal, Angola and Brazil. Pambos brought some notably good strikers to Cyprus that were crowned as top scorers for Doxa and in the Cypriot First Division such as Brazilians: David, Serjão and Portuguese Henrique as well as Angolan Freddy. He managed with this formula and with his trusted coaching team of: Assistant coach Marios Markou, Goalkeeping Coach Andreas Mavris, fitness coach Sotiris Charalambous and Kokos Evripidou and by playing attractive attacking football, against all odds kept Doxa in the Cypriot First Division for a record three consecutive years. When he left in 2010, something that underlies his good team building skills, for a bigger challenge in his career with Olympiakos Nicosia, Doxa was relegated back to the Cypriot Second Division.

Olympiakos Nicosia
In the 2010–2011 season, Pambos Christodoulou, an old Olympiakos player and ex-manager of Doxa Katokopias, together with his coaching team mentioned above, became manager of Olympiakos Nicosia. He brought with him from Doxa the following players: Brazilian defender, Rodrigo, Portuguese left back Pedro Duarte, Portuguese winger Carlos André, Cypriot holding midfielder Kyriakos Polykarpou and an old Olympiakos Nicosia player for many years, Defensive allrounder Nikolas Nicolaou, to form the basis of his new squad. He overhauled the squad bringing in players from Portugal, Brazil, Angola and Nigerian and Cameroon strikers. As well as left back and best friend Rui Paulo Silva Júnior, Olympiakos showed good attacking football in the 2010–2011 season, easily avoiding relegation and having qualified for the Cup quarterfinals. The club played fluid attacking football having the third best attacking record after leaders APOEL and 3rd placed Anorthosis, playing with a 4–4–2 formation with pressing from within the opponent's half, but the Achilles heel of the team that year had been the bad defensive record with goals conceded in most games and the third worst record in this area.
Christodoulou decided to leave the club in 2011 together with all his coaching team and Rui Paulo Silva Júnior, who retired as a footballer to become Director of Football, but without his assistant manager Marios Markou who stayed on at Olympiakos, to join AEL Limassol, one year before his contract expired. Olympiakos Nicosia decided to pursue this breach in court. Subsequently AEL offered compensation via an out of court settlement offering an undisclosed sum of money to Olympiakos for the release of Christodoulou. The offer was accepted by Olympiakos and Christodoulou, officially coaches AEL for the 2011 – 2012 season.

AEL Limassol
In 2011, he decided to make what he personally believed as a big step and big risk in his career. He moved to one of the clubs of Cyprus with a large following, AEL Limassol together with the coaching team mentioned above, except assistant Marios Markou. He started his rebuilding of AEL in the usual fashion, bringing as a basis players that played for him in Doxa such as Brazilian winger Edmar, Cypriot winger Georgios Eleftheriou and together with players that he had originally brought to Cyprus for Doxa and were now at AEL such as Portuguese striker Henrique formed the basis of his new team. To these he added many players from the Portuguese 2nd level as well as keeping around 8 players already at AEL and adding 2 non Portuguese based players striker Cafu from Anorthosis Famagusta and star Goalkeeper Matías Omar Degra from Greek side Asteras Tripoli F.C. At pre-season interviews Pambos expressed his great desire  to succeed at AEL by winning titles and has said that the greater budget available to him at this club will help him achieve this. He pleaded patience with his new club's supporters who are notorious for their high expectations. Pambos has acknowledged that moving to AEL is a great risk as the club is well known for its frequent managerial changes in the past 10 years, however, the fact that he is a personal friend of AEL chairman Andreas Sofocleous (as they served their military service together) will give him more goodwill than previous AEL managers. He has disclosed that a secret of his success is to manage the wage bill of his players so all players earn just about the same amount, also players who are younger and relatively less well known are given slightly less to have an incentive to perform to catch up with their team players. All players are signed on a 1+1 year contract with the option with the club to renew thus giving more incentives. No stars are usually signed and the budget is the 4th highest of all Cypriot teams. AEL also qualified for the UEFA Europa league group stage under Pambos. Despite Pambos Christodoulou's achievements at AEL, Andreas Sofocleous the AEL chairman removed Pambos from the managerial position on 22 October 2012 for undisclosed reasons and with mutual consent.

Title Winner
He had a dream-like first season at AEL not conceding any goals in the first 5 games and the team was unbeaten. At the end of the second round AEL finished top of the table  3 points clear of the second placed team, conceding only 7 goals, the best defensive record of all the league teams. In the play-off round AEL battled with the top 4 teams for the championship winning it with one game to go conceding only 9 goals and is in the cup final. Pambos has managed to bring to AEL the championship crown, which the team last won in 1968, and is in the final of the cup and has achieved cult status among AEL's demanding supporters. For this he is nicknamed by AEL fans "Pambourinho", a combination of his name and of Jose Mourinho.

Anorthosis Famagusta 
On 2 April 2013 – Christodoulou signed a 6 game short term contract with title contenders Anorthosis Famagusta. Hope are that despite being 6 points behind current leaders APOEL – that Pambos will scurry the low esteem the team currently find themselves in, pick up tactics and cover the difference – in time to win the title at the end of the season. At his first four matches, Anorthosis didn't manage to win any game and didn't manage to score any goal also, dropping to third place of the league, two matches before the end. His contract carried a renewal option for the upcoming season but it was not exercised.

Cyprus National Football Team 
On 9 January 2014, Christodoulou was appointed by the Cyprus Football Association as the new national team coach in charge through qualifying for the European Championship of 2016.

AEL Limassol
On 8 February 2016 Christodoulou came back to the club, with whom he won the title, for an 18 months contract.

AC Omonia
On 27 March 2017 Christodoulou was appointed by AC Omonia as the new team manager. Christodoulou will take charge from the beginning of the 2017–18 season. On 5 December 2017, was sacked by the team as a result of the bad performance of the team.

Olympiakos Nicosia
On 27 May 2019 Christodoulou was re-appointed as manager of Olympiakos Nicosia.

Sevan 

On 11 August 2021, Christodoulou was appointed as the new manager of Armenian Premier League club Sevan.

Honours

As a manager
AEL Limassol
 Cypriot First Division: 2011–12
 Cypriot Cup: Runner-up 2012

Career statistics

Manager

 No statistics for Anorthisis.

References

Living people
1967 births
Sportspeople from Nicosia
Cypriot footballers
Association football midfielders
Doxa Katokopias FC players
Olympiakos Nicosia players
AEK Larnaca FC players
Cypriot football managers
AEL Limassol managers
Cyprus national football team managers
Anorthosis Famagusta F.C. managers
AC Omonia managers
Nea Salamis Famagusta FC managers
Olympiakos Nicosia managers
Doxa Katokopias FC managers